George William Parry (April 9, 1889 – October 30, 1968) was a Canadian politician who was a Member of Provincial Parliament in Legislative Assembly of Ontario from 1945 to 1963. He represented the riding of Kent West for the Ontario Progressive Conservative Party. He was a farmer.

References

1889 births
1968 deaths
Progressive Conservative Party of Ontario MPPs